Howell B. Treat (March 31, 1833 – July 21, 1912) was an American soldier who fought in the American Civil War. He received his country's highest award for bravery during combat, the Medal of Honor. Treat's medal was won when he risked his life to save a wounded comrade at Buzzard's Roost on May 11, 1864. He was honored with the award on February 20, 1884.

Treat was born in Connecticut. He came to Claridon Twp., Geauga County, Ohio as a baby, and entered service from there. He was buried in Painesville, Ohio.

Medal of Honor citation

See also
List of American Civil War Medal of Honor recipients: T–Z

References

1833 births
1912 deaths
American Civil War recipients of the Medal of Honor
People from Painesville, Ohio
People of Ohio in the American Civil War
Union Army officers
United States Army Medal of Honor recipients